Santu Mukhopadhyay (14 January 1951 – 11 March 2020) was an Indian actor who worked in Bengali cinema. He was the father of actress Swastika Mukherjee. His younger brother, Sumanta Mukherjee, is also an actor.

Early life and biography 
Santu Mukherjee was born on 17 January 1951 in Kolkata. He attended the Mitra Institution at Bhowanipore at a primary level and later, joined the Padmapukur Institution at Sarat Bose Road, from where he passed his Higher Secondary Examination. He soon dropped out from studies and took dance lessons from Gopal Bhattacharya. He also learned Rabindra Sangeet.

He went to renowned director Tapan Sinha, seeking a role in Bengali films. In 1975, Sinha launched him as an actor in the film Raja. Subsequent to his cinematic breakthrough, he working in theater and films. His last film was Sanjhbati.

Mukherjee died on 11 March 2020 from cardiac arrest at his South Kolkata residence; he had been suffering from cancer for a long time.

Filmography

Television 
Santu's acting reached its pinnacle when he started acting in the Television serial shows. Some of the popular shows were:
 Keya Patar Nouko
 Ishti Kutum
 Saat Paake Bandha (later replaced by Rohit Mukherjee) 
 Jol Nupur 
 Kojagori
 Ichche Nodee
 Kusum Dola 
 Andarmahal
 Phagun Bou
 Mayurpankhi
 Nokshi Kantha  
 Mohor (later replaced by Dulal Lahiri)

Santu Mukherjee as Singer
Santu recorded several songs. 
In the Bengali movie "Parabot Priya" Santu Mukherjee sang a duet song (Rabindra Sangeet) along with co-artist Arundhati Hom Choudhury: "Amar hridoy tomar apon hater dole".

In the album "Ei akashe amar Mukti aloy aloy" he sang the title song along with his daughter Swastika. His rendition "Tumi daak diyechho kon sokale" was mesmerizing.

References

External links 
 

1951 births
2020 deaths
Indian male film actors
20th-century Indian male actors
Male actors in Bengali cinema
Bengali male actors
21st-century Indian male actors
Male actors from Kolkata